Passignano may refer to:

Passignano sul Trasimeno, a comune in the Province of Perugia, Italy
Badia di Passignano, an abbey in Tavarnelle Val di Pesa
Domenico Passignano (1559–1638), Italian painter